The following Union Army units and commanders fought in the Battle of Champion Hill of the American Civil War. The Confederate order of battle is listed separately. Order of battle compiled from the army organization, returns of casualties and reports.

Abbreviations used

Military rank
 MG = Major General
 BG = Brigadier General
 Col = Colonel
 Ltc = Lieutenant Colonel
 Maj = Major
 Cpt = Captain
 Lt = 1st Lieutenant

Other
 w = wounded
 mw = mortally wounded
 k = killed

Army of the Tennessee

MG Ulysses S. Grant

XIII Corps

MG John A. McClernand
Escort:
 3rd Illinois Cavalry (Company L): Cpt David R. Sparks

XV Corps

MG William T. Sherman

XVII Corps

MG James B. McPherson

Provisional Cavalry Battalion: Cpt John S. Foster
 2nd Illinois Cavalry (Companies A & B): Lt W. B. Cummins
 4th Missouri Cavalry (Company F): Lt A. Mueller
 4th Independent Company Ohio Cavalry: Cpt John S. Foster

See also

 Mississippi in the American Civil War

Notes

References
U.S. War Department, The War of the Rebellion: a Compilation of the Official Records of the Union and Confederate Armies, U.S. Government Printing Office, 1880–1901.
 The Battle of Champion Hill website

American Civil War orders of battle